Philip Richard Llewelyn Morgan (11 March 1927 – 12 January 2017) was an English sportsman, clergyman and educator.

Life
He was born at Derby in March 1927, the eldest son of the Rev. Morgan Brinley Morgan, in a family of seven sons and one daughter. He was brought up for a time in Highams Park in east London; his father became vicar of Hockley from 1935. He was educated at St Edmund's School at Hindhead, and St John's School, Leatherhead. 

In 1945 Morgan went to the University of Oxford, supported by the Royal Air Force, where he studied modern history at Wadham College and theology at St Stephen's House. While studying at Oxford, he made a single appearance in first-class cricket against the touring Indians at Oxford in 1946. He then spent time in Southern Rhodesia as a trainee pilot, returning to Oxford in 1948.

Morgan at this period was known as a middle and long-distance runner. He beat the future Olympic champion Chris Brasher in the Varsity three-mile race in 1951, and three years later he ran in the race that proceeded Roger Bannister's record-breaking four-minute mile at Iffley Road. 

Morgan took holy orders in the Church of England. Morgan's first ecclesiastical post was as curate of Warlingham, Surrey from 1955–58. He then became the chaplain of Haileybury and Imperial Service College, before becoming the headmaster of the college's junior school. Following his retirement from Haileybury, he later became the rector of The Deverills in Wiltshire. Morgan died suddenly in January 2017 at Winslow, Buckinghamshire.

References

External links

1927 births
2017 deaths
Cricketers from Derby
People educated at St John's School, Leatherhead
Alumni of Wadham College, Oxford
Alumni of St Stephen's House, Oxford
English cricketers
Oxford University cricketers
English male middle-distance runners
English male long-distance runners
20th-century English Anglican priests
Schoolteachers from Hertfordshire
21st-century English Anglican priests